Parliament in the Making was a programme of events organised by the Parliament of the United Kingdom to commemorate a series of anniversaries in 2015 including:

 the sealing of Magna Carta, on 15 June 1215, 800 years earlier
 the first representative parliament, Simon de Montfort's Parliament, on 20 January 1265, 750 years earlier
 the Battle of Agincourt on 25 October 1415, 600 years earlier
 the Battle of Waterloo on 18 June 1815, 200 years earlier
 the death of Winston Churchill on 24 January 1965, 50 years earlier
 the first Race Relations Act on 8 December 1965, 50 years earlier

Programme of events
The Houses of Parliament organised several events during 2015 as part of the "Parliament in the Making" programme. These included exhibitions and talks about Winston Churchill that covered his involvement with the Parliament of the United Kingdom, which from 1801 to 1922 represented Great Britain and Ireland. A broader exhibition looked at the development of human rights and representation in the British Isles. The impact of Magna Carta on Parliament over the last 800 years was the subject of another exhibition. Furthermore, on Sunday 14 June 2015 at 3pm, Parliament encouraged everyone to "sit down to tea to celebrate, debate or reflect on their liberties" as part of an event called "LiberTeas".

Democracy Day
The BBC broadcast a "Democracy Day" on 20 January 2015 to coincide with the 750th anniversary of Montfort's Parliament. It was broadcast in partnership with the House of Commons and the House of Lords, including broadcasts from inside the Palace of Westminster. Montfort's parliament of 1265 was the first time that representatives of towns and shires were summoned together with nobles and bishops to discuss matters of national concern, something which ultimately paved the way for the emergence of the House of Commons.

During the day, live discussions were held about parliament, politics and democracy, which were participated in by people across the world. The first event was a discussion in the Speaker's House, led by Michael Sandel, professor of government at Harvard University, about democracy's "many facets, inherent tensions". Other discussions addressed open data and transparency in government; how the UK Parliament works; women in government; Islam and democracy; Africa and democracy; democracy and technology; and the influence of television dramas, in particular whether dramas such as The West Wing, Borgen or This House contribute to the public's understanding of the way politicians and government represent them or whether they adversely affect perceptions about this.

BBC Radio hosted a discussion with the United States Ambassador to the United Kingdom and the Ambassador of France to the United Kingdom. BBC News opened up its internal editorial meetings to live broadcasts.

Articles published during the day include a review of memorable speeches from 750 years of Parliament, and a timeline of  the development of democracy in the United Kingdom from 1215 to today.

Concurrent events
Taking place concurrently with the Parliament in the Making programme, there were other events celebrating the same themes and anniversaries. In particular, the 800th anniversary of Magna Carta was celebrated throughout the United Kingdom as well as in the United States and other countries.

The BBC organised a season of programmes under the title "Taking Liberties". Consisting of television and radio broadcasts, as well as online content, these programmes addressed the history and influence of Magna Carta since its sealing eight centuries earlier. Programmes during the season also looked critically at contemporary democracy in the UK and worldwide.

The British Library hosted an extensive exhibition under the title "Magna Carta: Law, Liberty, Legacy". The British Library described the exhibition as exploring "the history and significance of this globally-recognised document" which has become "a potent symbol of liberty and the rule of law". The exhibitions featured other celebrated international documents including Thomas Jefferson's handwritten copy of the Declaration of Independence and an original copy of the United States Bill of Rights. Furthermore, the four surviving original copies of the 1215 Magna Carta held by the British Library and the cathedrals of Lincoln and Salisbury were located in the same place for the first time ever at an event at the British Library on 3 February and displayed together again in Parliament on 5 February 2015.

Historical events in the development of Parliament

The Parliament in the Making programme was intended to "raise awareness of our democratic heritage with Parliament at the heart of the story". The following table summarises some of the main events in the development of the Parliament of the United Kingdom.

During his May 2011 state visit to the United Kingdom, United States President Barack Obama gave a speech to both Houses of Parliament in Westminster Hall which made reference to the role of Parliament in developing democracy, rights and liberties.

See also

 Constitution of the United Kingdom
 Parliament Week
 The History of Parliament
 Westminster system

References

External links
 Parliament in the Making website
 Democracy Day live reporting
 Democracy Day website
 BBC 'Taking Liberties' website
 LiberTeas website

Parliament of the United Kingdom
Politics of the United Kingdom
Civil rights and liberties in the United Kingdom
2015 in the United Kingdom
2015 in British politics